Madley Communications Centre is BT Group's earth satellite tracking station, between Madley and Kingstone, Herefordshire, England.

Earth position
The site dates from 1975 and is in active use for international telephone, fax and television transmission and reception. The station is in the civil parish of Kingstone, although most of the former airfield is in Madley, to the west of the site. The Roman road running south from Kenchester passes close to the north of the site.

Geology of the area
The site is in a sheltered rock bowl between the Malvern Hills and the Black Mountains. This allowed the ground to take the weight of the large receiving dishes, but the most important fact was the lack of background electronic noise. What nearby electronic noise there was compared to the strength of heat felt on the Moon from an electric fireplace on Earth.

History
The site first went into service in September 1978 on the site of the disused World War II airfield RAF Madley, built in 1940.

Structures
There are over 65 dishes, the smallest being 90 cm (3') with the three main dishes each having a diameter of 32 metres (105') and weighing 290 tonnes. The site covers a range from 66 degrees east to 314 degrees east, covering two thirds of the planet.

Transmissions
Madley was the first UK satellite site to transmit a fully digital transmission via time division multiple access (TDMA).

Until its closure in 2008, Goonhilly in Cornwall provided a similar role.

Other use of grounds
The grounds are leased as an educational nature reserve, Madley Environmental Study Centre.

References

External links 
BT VSAT Services

Madley Environmental Study Centre
 Calling Hereford Radio 4 September 2009
 30th anniversary in September 1978
 30th anniversary
 Photo of station
 Photo of site

British Telecom buildings and structures
Buildings and structures in Herefordshire
Earth stations in England
Buildings and structures completed in 1978
Science and technology in Herefordshire
Transatlantic telecommunications 
1978 establishments in England